Life After Jive: 2000 to 2005 is the fourth greatest hits album by the American rapper Spice 1, released on April 4, 2006, on Real Talk Entertainment. The album has production by Big Hollis, Blackjack, DJ Epik, Pimp C, Spice 1 and Tone Tovin. The songs were recorded between 2000 and 2005, after Spice 1's last album on Jive Records was released, Immortalized, in 1999. Several guest performers appear on the album, including MC Eiht, UGK, Tray Dee, Celly Cel, Kurupt, Bad Azz, Jayo Felony, Yukmouth, C-Bo, MJG and Outlawz.

Several tracks from Life After Jive also appeared on Spice 1's 2002 greatest hits album, Hits 3, including "Murder Man Dance", "You Got Me Fucked Up", "Ride or Die", "Chocolate Philly" and "Playa Pieces".

Track listing 
 "Spiceberg Slim" - 3:36 (from the album Spiceberg Slim)
 "Murder Man Dance" (featuring UGK) - 4:31 (from the album The Last Dance)
 "Niggaz Like Us" - 4:33 (featuring Bun B & Celly Cel) (from the album Criminal Activity)
 "Touch Me, Feel Me, Smell Me" - 4:21 (from the album The Playa Rich Project)
 "No One Else" (featuring MC Eiht) - 4:14 (from the album Keep It Gangsta)
 "Gangbang Music" (featuring Tha Eastsidaz) - 4:07 (from the album The Ridah)
 "G.A.M.E." (featuring Bad Azz & Da Game Bangers) - 3:29 (from the album The Last Dance)
 "You Got Me Fucked Up" - 3:15 (from the album Spiceberg Slim)
 "Ride or Die" (featuring Jayo Felony, Tray Dee & Yukmouth) - 4:24 (from the album The Playa Rich Project)
 "Playa Pieces" - 4:35 (from the album The Last Dance)
 "That's the Way Life Goes" (featuring MC Eiht) - 4:34 (from the album The Pioneers)
 "My Life" (featuring Jayo Felony & Celly Cel) - 4:23 (from the album Criminal Activity)
 "Ride 4 Me" (featuring C-Bo & Rod-Dee) - 4:28 (from the album The Playa Rich Project)
 "They Just Don't Know" (featuring MC Eiht) - 3:41 (from the album Keep It Gangsta)
 "Can't Stop Us" (featuring MC Eiht) - 3:44 (from the album The Pioneers)
 "Chocolate Philly" (featuring MJG) - 4:20 (from the album The Last Dance)
 "Turn da Heat Down" (featuring Outlawz) - 5:12 (from the album Spiceberg Slim)
 "I Ain't Scared" (featuring MC Eiht) - 2:52 (from the album The Pioneers)
 "Thug World" (featuring Kurupt) - 3:25 (from the album The Ridah)

References

External links 
[ Life After Jive: 2000 to 2005] at Allmusic
Life After Jive: 2000 to 2005 at Tower Records

2006 greatest hits albums
Spice 1 albums
Real Talk Entertainment compilation albums
Albums produced by Big Hollis
Gangsta rap compilation albums